Hadena variolata is a species of cutworm or dart moth in the family Noctuidae. It is found in North America.

The MONA or Hodges number for Hadena variolata is 10326.

Subspecies
These two subspecies belong to the species Hadena variolata:
 Hadena variolata dealbata (Staudinger, 1892)
 Hadena variolata variolata

References

Further reading

 
 
 

Hadena
Articles created by Qbugbot
Moths described in 1888